Echo Delta is a hybrid strategy game designed by Clever Trick shown the year 2000 at Nintendo's Space World event. The game has players rush to raise a sunken ship with an armored submarine called Scout. Using Scout the player can pick up resources and defend the core that mines resources at a faster rate. If a player collects enough energy the ship will be raised and everything is golden. Although mostly complete, Nintendo chose to cancel this game's release on the Nintendo 64.

References

Cancelled Nintendo 64 games
Marigul Management games
Nintendo games
Strategy video games